The 1992 United States presidential election in Colorado took place on November 3, 1992, as part of the 1992 United States presidential election. Voters chose eight representatives, or electors to the Electoral College, who voted for president and vice president.

Colorado was won by the Democratic nominees, Governor Bill Clinton of Arkansas and his running mate Senator Al Gore of Tennessee. Clinton and Gore defeated the Republican nominees, incumbent President George H. W. Bush of Texas and Vice President  Dan Quayle of Indiana. Independent businessman Ross Perot of Texas, and his running mate Navy Vice Admiral James Stockdale, finished in a relatively strong third in the state.

Clinton received 40.13% of the vote to Bush's 35.87%, a Democratic victory margin of 4.26 points. 

Ross Perot performed exceptionally well for a third party candidate in the state, receiving 23.32% of the vote in Colorado, exceeding his nationwide 18.91% vote share. Perot bested Clinton or Bush for second place in 19 out of Colorado’s 64 Counties and also won pluralities of the vote in Moffat County and San Juan County, the state providing Perot two county victories out of only fifteen county equivalents which Perot won nationwide.

Clinton ultimately won the national vote, defeating incumbent President Bush.

Clinton's victory marked the first time since the nationwide Democratic landslide of 1964, and the last time until 2008, that the Centennial State had voted Democratic, as well as the first time since 1932 in which a non-incumbent Democrat would carry the state, along with an incumbent Republican president losing it. Clinton won Clear Creek, Eagle, Gunnison, Routt, and Summit Counties for the Democrats for the first time since 1964; they have all gone on to vote Democratic in every subsequent election as of 2020, save in 2000, when many of them gave plurality wins to George W. Bush (in what was also the last election, as of 2020, that Colorado has voted Republican by more than 5%). Clinton also won the city of Denver by more than 30%, a larger margin than any nominee had won it by since 1964, and won Boulder County, a then-traditionally Republican county that Dukakis had won by 8.5%, by 24.3%.

These improvements lay the groundwork for Colorado's increasingly competitive status from 2004 on, and increasingly established status as a blue state from 2020 on. For the time being, however, Colorado remained a lean-red state, with George H. W. Bush retaining the large Denver suburban counties of Jefferson and Arapahoe, albeit narrowly. In 1996, Dole would improve on George H. W. Bush's margins in these two counties, and would also take back Larimer County, helping him narrowly carry the state despite losing nationally by 8.5%. 

As of the 2020 presidential election, this is the last election in which Moffat County did not support the Republican candidate  and the only election since 1944 in which Colorado did not support the same candidate as Virginia.

Results

Results by county

Notes

References

Colorado
1992
1992 Colorado elections